"Play Hard" is a song by French DJ and record producer David Guetta featuring vocals from American singers Ne-Yo and Akon. It was released on 15 March 2013 as the third single from the 2012 re-release of Guetta's fifth studio album, Nothing but the Beat (2011). This is the second collaboration between Guetta and Akon since "Sexy Bitch" in 2009. All three artists co-wrote the song along with Frédéric Riesterer and Giorgio Tuinfort, both of whom produced the song with Guetta. It features a prominent synth riff sampled from the 1999 trance song "Better Off Alone" by Alice Deejay. 

"Play Hard" peaked at number six on the UK Singles Chart, thus becoming his fourteenth top 10 hit in the UK as a lead artist. It also charted within the top 10 of the charts in several other countries including Austria, Belgium, Czech Republic, France, Germany, Ireland, Israel, Italy, Luxembourg, Poland, Scotland, Slovakia, South Korea, Spain and Switzerland; as well as the top 20 in Australia, Denmark, Finland, Iceland and New Zealand.

Music video
An official music video was uploaded to Guetta's official Vevo channel on April 22, 2013. The video uses the New Edit version of the song. Directed by Swede Andreas Nilsson, it generated controversy for its stereotypical portrayal of Mexico. The video and an advertisement from Neon Mixr feature the popular dancers, Les Twins. The video has over 1.1 billion views as of October 2022.

Track listing

Charts and certifications

Weekly charts

Year-end charts

Certifications

Release history

References

2012 songs
2013 singles
David Guetta songs
Ne-Yo songs
Akon songs
Songs written by David Guetta
Songs written by Giorgio Tuinfort
Songs written by Akon
Songs written by Ne-Yo
Songs written by Frédéric Riesterer
Music videos directed by Andreas Nilsson
Number-one singles in Hungary
Song recordings produced by David Guetta
Parlophone singles